Eyimofe Doyle Atake, (born 20 February 1958) is a Nigerian lawyer. He was named a Senior Advocate of Nigeria in 1999.

Early life
Atake was born in Sapele, a town in southern Nigeria to Honourable Justice FOM Atake, a Judge of the High Court of Mid-western Nigeria (1967-1977) and a Senator of the Federal Republic of Nigeria (1979-1982) and his wife, Victoria Arugha Patricia Atake (née Foss).

Atake attended St. Saviours School in Ikoyi, Lagos, while his father served as a Senior Magistrate in the colony of Lagos in the 1950s and early 1960s. He also attended a number of other schools across Nigeria as his father was occasionally transferred to work as a judicial officer in different parts of the country and his family moved along with him, the schools include Emotan Preparatory School, Benin, Our Lady's Preparatory School, Sapele, and Hussey Model School Warri. Atake was educated at an independent boarding school for boys Copford College, Copford, Colchester, England, where he became a School Prefect, House Captain, Athletics and Table Tennis Captain and played Soccer and Rugby for the school teams.

Atake attended the London School of Economics and Political Science and Darwin College, University of Cambridge where he earned a doctorate degree in law in 1987, under the supervision of David Williams (British legal scholar). His PhD thesis titled Contempt in the Face of the Court and the Procedure for Committal made comparisons between the legal systems of England and Wales, the United States of America, Canada, Australia, New Zealand, India and Nigeria. That work formed the basis for a book Contempt in the Face of the Court published in 1992.

Eyimofe Atake attended The Hague Academy of International Law (1980 and 1981) and studied International Law under the guidance of Rosalyn Higgins, Baroness Higgins, while at the London School of Economics and wrote an LL.M dissertation under her supervision - Is restitution an appropriate remedy for taking of foreign property in contemporary International Law?

Career
 

Atake was admitted to the Nigerian Bar in July 1983. In 1987, he did his pupillage for one year with Chief G O K Ajayi, at law firm GOK Ajayi & Co. In 1988, he set up his law firm Eyimofe Atake & Co. Barristers and Solicitors specializing in Maritime Law, Oil and Gas, Arbitration and commercial litigation. In about 12 years of being in law practice and setting up of his Law Firm, he took Silk becoming a Senior Advocate of Nigeria (SAN) in 1999 at the age of 41.

Atake has represented clients in the areas of Maritime/Admiralty Law, Constitutional and Commercial Law in Nigerian courts of various levels. In 2009, Atake convinced a Judge in a trial involving American witnesses that the court be moved to New York in the United States to hear further proceedings as the American witnesses were too old and ill to travel to Nigeria for the trial.

In a 1997 case where Atake represented the defendants/Appellants, he convinced the Justices of the Supreme Court to rule that a case that has been discontinued and struck out, did not prevent a Court from making consequential orders, where it is established that, the Plaintiff who discontinued the case has abused the legal process by using the process of the court to gain unmerited advantages over the defendant, to the detriment of that Defendant. 
In 1994, Atake persuaded a full bench of seven Justices of the Supreme Court of Nigeria to decide that a judicial officer who has seized to be one could appear for himself in person in a court of law rather than being represented by counsel and that the Constitution of the Federal Republic of Nigeria did not place such a bar on a judicial officer who has seized to be one. Atake wrote on the Legal Aspects of Privatisation during the exercise in Nigeria in the 1990s. As a result of his extensive writings in the press and comments on television, he was invited to deliver and delivered the Public Lecture on the Legal Aspects of Privatisation and Commercialisation  at the International Conference organized by the Technical Committee on Privatisation and Commercialisation (TCPC) in 1990.
He served in the sub-committee of the Technical Committee on Privatisation and Commercialisation (TCPC) for the privatisation of the Nigerian Fish Company.

Athletics and fashion
Atake represented the University of Cambridge in Athletics against Oxford in all three years he spent in Cambridge, and he served as President of the Oxford and Cambridge Club of Nigeria between 2002 and 2006.

He has at various times been described as one of the best dressed men in Nigeria  and one of the best dressed lawyers and a Nigerian worthy of note. He is known for his sense of style and has featured in several newspapers and magazines and won various professional and style  awards. For several decades he has been well known in the social scene and circles.

Personal life
He is married to Dorothy Atake (née Kuku). He has four Children, Eyitoritse, Timofe, Oritselaju and Amatoritsero.

Publications

Selected writings
Contempt in the Face of the Court (Book) (1992)
Before We Privatise (1) The Guardian, Wednesday, February 22, 1989, 10. 
Before We Privatise (2), The Guardian, Thursday, February 23, 1989, 11.
Privatisation and The Law (1), The Guardian, Tuesday, September 13, 1988, 11. 
Privatisation and The Law (11), The Guardian, Wednesday, September 14, 1988, 13.
Privatisation, Commercialisation and Decree No. 25 of 1988, The Financial Post, June 11, 1989, 38.
The Legal Aspects of the Implementation of the Privatisation and Commercialisation Programmes (Chapter) in H. R. Zayyad's Economic Democratisation (TCPC, Lagos, 1992)
Between the Executive and The Legislature Excerpts from a paper delivered by Dr. Eyimofe Atake, SAN at a workshop on Public Accounts and Democracy organized by the Senate Committee on Public Accounts, THISDAY, The Sunday Newspaper, March 12, 2000, 38, 39.
Contempt in The Face of The Court – Mike Okoye's Case THISDAY, Vol. 8, No. 2522, Tuesday, March 19, 2002, 30, 42, 43
Supreme Court and the Allegation of Corruption, (Guest Columnist), THISDAY, Vol. 11, no. 3726, Tuesday, July 5, 2005, 51.
(Guest Columnist) National Assembly Can Raise Budget Estimates (Back Page), THISDAY, Vol. 6, No. 1856, Monday, May 22, 2000, 56.
Disqualification in Contempt Cases, SUNDAY TIMES, 25 March 1990, at 12–14.
Attorney-General's Advice to the Inspector General of Police, Curious. Extraordinary ThisDay, Vol. 10, NO. 2201, Tuesday, January 27, 2004, 45, 46. 
Can These Men Re-Contest the Governorship THISDAY, Tuesday October 9, 2001.
Taslim Elias: The Exit of a Genius, Sunday Times August 25, 1991, 27.
T O Elias: An Appreciation, The Guardian, Wednesday, September 4, 1991.
Elegy to a Judge and Senator (1) THISDAY, vol. 9, no. 2900, Tuesday, April 1, 2003, 41.
Elegy to a Judge and Senator (2) THISDAY, vol. 9, no. 2907, Tuesday, April 8, 2003, 48.
G.O.K Ajayi: An Appreciation ThisDay Tuesday 20 May 2014. 
'Folake Solanke: First Female Silk @85, THISDAY, 11 April 2017, 14. 
Frank Odunayo Akinrele, SAN 1930-2018: An Appreciation, ThisDay 1 January 2019.

References 

1958 births
Living people
20th-century Nigerian lawyers
21st-century Nigerian lawyers
People from Delta State
Itsekiri people
Alumni of the London School of Economics
Alumni of Darwin College, Cambridge
The Hague Academy of International Law people
Senior Advocates of Nigeria